The Women's team time trial of the 2012 UCI Road World Championships cycling event took place on 16 September 2012 in the province of Limburg, Netherlands.

It was the first such event for trade teams.

Participation 
Invitations were sent to the 20 leading UCI Women's Teams in the team rankings on 15 August 2012. Sengers Ladies Cycling Team, which entered the top 20 on 26 August was invited as well. Twelve teams accepted the invitation within the deadline and got the right to participate. Each team consisted of six riders.

  
 1: UCI women's teams ranking as of 15 August 2012

Parcours 
The teams completed a course that was  starting from Sittard and finishing in Valkenburg aan de Geul. There were two named climbs: the Lange Raarberg (1300m, 4.5%) and the famous Cauberg (1200m 5.8%) that features in the Amstel Gold Race. The finish was located 1.5 km after the top of the Cauberg.

Pre-race favourite
 was the top favourite for the team time trial. The team won all the team time trials that season however the difference in time between the number two in each time trial, Orica–AIS, became each time trial smaller. A difference between the time trials that year and the one at the World Championships was that the World Championships was on a hilly parcours and all the other ones were flat.

Race 
 were the last team down the start ramp and Ina-Yoko Teutenberg, the squad's weakest climber on paper, put in a shift on the front in the early, flat kilometres, ensuring that the team broke more or less even with Orica–AIS. At the first time check after 11 km, the Orica–AIS sextet was less than a second behind Specialized–lululemon. Specialized–lululemon began to come to the fore and the team set a ferocious tempo up the climb of the Lange Raarberg, a little under two-thirds of the way into the race. At the second time check Specialized–lululemon coming through 13 seconds clear of the rivals. With Orica–AIS reduced to the minimum four for the finale, they remained in contention on the final climb of the Cauberg hill and crossed the line after the false flat 1:35 quicker than AA Drink–leontien.nl squad. Specialized–lululemon's Evelyn Stevens hit the front up the Cauberg hill with 20 seconds in hand and once over the top, Amber Neben, Trixi Worrack, Charlotte Becker and local favourite Ellen van Dijk took over for the final push to the line and brought Specialized–lululemon home to claim the first women's world team time trial victory.

Final classification

Data from uci.ch.

References

External links

Women's team time trial
UCI Road World Championships – Women's team time trial
2012 in women's road cycling